Schattenreiter is the fourth full-length studio album by the German industrial rock/medieval metal band Tanzwut. It was released on 7 April 2006 by PICA Music as a two-CD digipak. The album marks their newfound sound, which incorporates a more down-tuned use of guitars, darker atmospheres and harsher vocals at times than their previous albums, making them lean towards industrial metal.

The album is eclectic in nature, ranging all the way from industrial metal with "Schattenreiter", thrash metal with "Geisterstunde", and even rockabilly with "Im tiefen Gras" to the gothic-influenced "Spieler" with many songs emanating a dance music feel to them. On the second CD, the song "Toccata" is a reworked version of a J.S. Bach composition which was recorded in a church in Berlin.

Track listing

CD 1
 "Schattenreiter" − 4:22
 "Der Arzt" − 4:12
 "Im tiefen Gras" − 3:17
 "Endlich" − 3:23
 "Dein zweites Gesicht" − 4:21 (extra vocals by Melanie Wiedemann)
 "Geisterstunde" − 2:41
 "Spieler" − 3:55
 "Seelenverkäufer" − 3:41
 "Immer noch wach" − 3:48 (featuring Schandmaul)
(Extra bagpipes by Birgit Muggenthaler)
(Violin by Anna Kränzlein)
(Extra vocals by Thomas Lindner)

CD 2
 "Intro" − 0:57
 "Toccata" − 4:00 (Organ by Dr. Hanno Fierdag, extra vocals by Melanie Wiedemann)
 "Der Bote" − 4:35
 "Versuchung" − 5:26
 "Vulkan" − 3:56
 "Kaltes Grauen" − 4:10
 "Du Sagst" − 3:35
 "Wieder am Riff" − 4:13
 "Gefangen" − 4:18
 "Signum Ignitum" − 5:30
 Video: Tanzwut Live in Moskau 2005 − 14:08

Credits
 Teufel − bagpipes, lead vocals
 Wim − bass, bagpipes, backing vocals, tromba marina
 Castus − bagpipes, shawm, tromba marina, backing vocals
 Ardor − bagpipes, shawm, tromba marina, backing vocals
 Hatz − percussion, key drum, electronic drums, Riesentara, keyboards
 Patrick − guitar, backing vocals, bagpipes, tromba marina
 Norri − percussion, keyboards

References

2006 albums
Tanzwut albums